The true parrots are about 350 species of hook-billed, mostly herbivorous birds forming the two superfamilies Psittacoidea, and Psittaculidae, two of the three superfamilies in the biological order Psittaciformes (parrots). True parrots are widespread, with species in Mexico, Central and South America, sub-Saharan Africa, India, Southeast Asia, Australia, and eastwards across the Pacific Ocean as far as Polynesia.  The true parrots include many of the familiar parrots including macaws, conures, lorikeets, eclectus, Amazon parrots, grey parrot, and budgerigar. Most true parrots are colourful and flighted, with a few notable exceptions.

Overview

True parrots have a beak with a characteristic curved shape, the jaw with a mobility slightly higher than where it connects with the skull, and a generally upright position. They also have a large cranial capacity and are one of the most intelligent bird groups. They are good fliers and skillful climbers on branches of trees.

Some species can imitate the human voice and other sounds, although they do not have vocal cords — instead possessing a vocal organ at the base of the trachea known as the syrinx.

Like most parrots, the Psittacidae are primarily seed eaters. Some variation is seen in the diet of individual species, with fruits, nuts, leaves, and even insects and other animal prey being taken on occasion by some species. The lorikeets are predominantly nectar feeders; many other parrots drink nectar, as well. Most Psittacidae are cavity-nesting birds which form monogamous pair bonds.

Distribution and habitat
The true parrots are distributed throughout the tropical and subtropical regions of the world, mostly in the Southern Hemisphere, covering many different habitats, from the humid tropical forests to deserts in Australia, India, Southeast Asia, sub-Saharan Africa, Central and South America, and two species, one extinct (the Carolina parakeet), formerly in the United States. However, the larger populations are native to Australasia, South America, and Central America.

Conservation status
Many species are classified as threatened by the International Union for Conservation of Nature (see IUCN Red List of birds), as well as national and nongovernmental organizations. Trade in birds and other wild animals is governed by the Convention on International Trade in Endangered Species of Wild Fauna and Flora (CITES).  Nearly all parrots are listed on CITES appendices, trade limited or prohibited. Trapping wild parrots for the pet trade, hunting, habitat loss, and competition from invasive species have diminished wild populations, with parrots being subjected to more exploitation than any other group of birds.  Of the animals removed from the wild to be sold, very few survive during capture and transport, and those that do often die from poor conditions of captivity, poor diet, and stress.  Measures taken to conserve the habitats of some high-profile charismatic species have also protected many of the less charismatic species living in the same ecosystems.

About 18 species of parrots have gone extinct since 1500 (see List of extinct birds#Psittaciformes), nearly all in superfamily Psittacoidea.

Taxonomy

The parrot family Psittacidae (along with the family Cacatuidae comprising the order Psittaciformes) was traditionally considered to contain two subfamilies, the Psittacinae (typical parrots and allies) and the Loriinae (lories and lorikeets).  However,  the tree of the parrot family now has been reorganized under the superfamily Psittacoidea: family Psittacidae has been split into three families, tribes Strigopini and Nestorini split out and placed under superfamily Strigopoidea and a new monotypic superfamily Cacatuoidea created containing family Cacatuidae.

The following classification is based on the most recent proposal, which in turn is based on all the relevant recent findings.

Family Psittacidae, New World and African parrots
Subfamily Psittacinae: Two African genera, Psittacus and Poicephalus
Subfamily Arinae
Tribe Arini: 17 genera, and one extinct genus
Tribe Androglossini: seven genera
clade (proposed tribe Amoropsittacini) four genera
clade (proposed tribe Forpini) one genus
(other tribes) five genera
Family Psittrichasiidae, Indian Ocean island parrots
Subfamily Psittrichasinae: one species, Pesquet's parrot
Subfamily Coracopsinae: one genus with several species
Family Psittaculidae, Asian and Australasian parrots, and lovebirds
Subfamily Platycercinae
 Tribe Pezoporini: ground parrots and allies
 Tribe Platycercini: broad-tailed parrots
Subfamily Psittacellinae: one genus (Psittacella) with several species
Subfamily Loriinae
 Tribe Loriini: lories and lorikeets
 Tribe Melopsittacini: one species, the budgerigar
 Tribe Cyclopsittini: fig parrots
Subfamily Agapornithinae: three genera
Subfamily Psittaculinae
 Tribe Polytelini: three genera
 Tribe Psittaculini: Asian psittacines
 Tribe Micropsittini: pygmy parrots

Species lists
Species list sortable alphabetically by common or scientific name
Species list in taxonomic order

Gallery

References

Further reading
 Bruce Thomas Boehner - Parrot Culture. Our 2,500-year-Long Fascination with the World's Most Talkative Bird (2004)

Notes

External links

Parrot videos on the Internet Bird Collection